Taphioporus is an extinct genus of leaf beetles in the subfamily Eumolpinae. It is known from Baltic and Rovno amber from the upper Eocene.

The generic name is a combination of the generic names Taphius (the old name for Pathius) and Cleoporus.

Species
 †Taphioporus balticus Moseyko & Kirejtshuk, 2013
 †Taphioporus carsteni Bukejs & Moseyko, 2015
 †Taphioporus rovnoi Moseyko & Perkovsky, 2015
 †Taphioporus rufous Bukejs & Moseyko, 2015

References

†
†
Prehistoric beetle genera
Baltic amber
Rovno amber
Eocene insects